The Inner Sanctum is the seventeenth studio album by British heavy metal band Saxon, released on 5 March 2007. It is the first album by the band to feature drummer Nigel Glockler since 1997's Unleash the Beast. A limited edition with DVD is available too.

Reception

The Inner Sanctum has received generally positive reviews from critics. Eduardo Rivadavia of AllMusic gave the album three and a half out of five stars, and commented that Saxon continued "to do their legacy proud as they move through their third decade of recording activity." He described the album's first three tracks as "frantic" and the third, "Let Me Feel Your Power" as "jaw-dropping", and also praised the "majestic" "Red Star Falling", comparing it to the band's earlier songs "Dallas 1PM" and "Broken Heroes", although he was critical towards the single version of "If I Was You", advising the listener to "make sure your CD contains the album version". Rivadavia concluded his review by saying "although it's certainly not perfect by any stretch, The Inner Sanctum is welcome addition to this band's sizeable discography, and, pound for pound, might just take the crown as Saxon's best album of the early 2000s."

However, Andy Lye of Jukebox:Metal was more critical in his review of the album, giving it three out of five stars, and criticizing its opening track "State of Grace", calling it "derivative and largely boring", and also "Let Me Feel Your Power" commenting that "a great, grooving mid-section can't quite save it from its appalling lyrics and tired riffs." He went on to call "I've Got to Rock (To Stay Alive)" "as bad as you'd expect" and criticized "If I Was You" for sounding "exactly like all metal singles sound". He concluded by stating that "Against the wider metal market this is an average album (hence three stars), but against recent Saxon output it is comfortably below average."

Track listing

CD 2 Limited Edition, Digipak Bonus DVD

Notes
 "Red Star Falling" is about the end of communism in Soviet Union.
 "Atila the Hun" is about Attila the Hun, who almost destroyed the Roman Empire.
 "If I Was You" is about asking why an individual would go from being an innocent child to a violent adult.
 "Let Me Feel Your Power" is about festivals like Wacken, which Saxon has headlined twice.
 "I've Got to Rock (to Stay Alive)" is about rock n' roll and life. The single version features guest appearances by heavy metal musicians Lemmy Kilmister, Angry Anderson, and Andi Deris.

Personnel
Biff Byford – vocals
Paul Quinn – guitar
Doug Scarratt – guitar
Nibbs Carter – bass guitar
Nigel Glockler – drums
 Matthias Ulmer – keyboards

Charts

References

2007 albums
2007 video albums
Saxon (band) albums
Saxon (band) video albums
SPV/Steamhammer albums
SPV/Steamhammer video albums
Albums produced by Charlie Bauerfeind